Stimela is a 1994 compilation album by South African jazz trumpeter Hugh Masekela. The album was compiled and produced by Masekela's long-time colleague Stewart Levine.

Reception
John Storm Roberts of Allmusic noted: "These recordings are largely in Afro-funk style, though with heavy township infusions in places, from the 1960s and 1970s, including his massive hit, 'Grazin' in the Grass.' As a jazz rather than a roots mbaqanga player, Masekela was a natural for this stuff, and (some studio trickery aside) it still stands tall and powerful."

Track listing

References

External links

1994 compilation albums
Hugh Masekela albums
Albums produced by Stewart Levine